The Human Rights Monument or Human Rights Sculpture is a monument in Turkey's capital, Ankara.

The monument was made by sculptor Metin Yurdanur in 1990 out of bronze. The monument which depicts a woman reading the Universal Declaration of Human Rights, has been the assembly point of many protests. The monument can be found at the intersection of Konur street and Yüksel street and its latest restoration was in 2010.

References

Sculptures of women in Turkey
1990 sculptures
Bronze sculptures in Turkey
Monuments and memorials in Ankara
Outdoor sculptures in Turkey